Danyeshka "Danna" Hernández Valentín (born 16 October 1996) is a Puerto Rican model and beauty pageant titleholder. she was crowned Miss Universe Puerto Rico 2017 on May 4, 2017, and represented Puerto Rico at the Miss Universe 2017 pageant.

Personal life
Hernández was born in San Juan, Puerto Rico. She is a model and also studies in the Department of Communications, Public Relations and Marketing at the University of Puerto Rico.

Beauty pageants

Miss Teen Americas Puerto Rico 2013
Hernández was crowned Miss Teen Americas Puerto Rico 2013 in El Salvador.

Miss Universe Puerto Rico 2017
On May 4, 2017, representing the capital city of San Juan, Hernández was crowned Miss Universe Puerto Rico 2017, succeeding Miss Universe Puerto Rico 2016 Brenda Jiménez. Hernandez represented Puerto Rico at the Miss Universe 2017 pageant but failed to place in the semifinals. This marked the first time since 1991 that Puerto Rico failed to place more than 3 years in a row.

References

External links

1996 births
Living people
Puerto Rican beauty pageant winners
Puerto Rican female models
Miss Universe 2017 contestants
University of Puerto Rico alumni